Herman Friele (born 21 August 1943) is a Norwegian businessman and politician for the Conservative Party. He has been chairman of the coffee manufacturer Friele since 1981, as the seventh generation Friele in charge of the company. He was the highly popular mayor of Bergen from 2003 to 2007.

Before the 2003 election, a survey found that 64% of the inhabitants of Bergen wanted him to become the mayor after the election. When Friele announced that he would not be running for mayor in the 2007 election, a survey showed that 60% of the inhabitants of Bergen wanted him to continue in the job.

References

1943 births
Living people
Norwegian drink industry businesspeople
Mayors of Bergen
Conservative Party (Norway) politicians
Norwegian businesspeople
Businesspeople in coffee